The Älpliseehorn is a mountain of the Plessur Alps, located south of Arosa in Graubünden. It is part of the range east of the Aroser Rothorn. On the north side of the mountain lies the Älplisee.

References

External links

 Älpliseehorn on Hikr

Mountains of the Alps
Mountains of Switzerland
Mountains of Graubünden
Two-thousanders of Switzerland